Revanche may refer to:
 Revanchism, a political concept
 Revanche (film), a 2008 Austrian thriller
 Revanche (Marvel Comics), a comic book superhero
 Revanche (album)
 French ship Revanche, two ships of the French navy

See also 
 Revenge (disambiguation)